Skonto Stadium is a football stadium in Riga, Latvia. The stadium was built in 2000 and currently has 8,087 seats in total (open for spectators & VIP guests on matchdays). It is the 2nd-largest stadium in Latvia, behind Daugava Stadium. The stadium design incorporates Skonto Hall.

Description 

Skonto Stadium is located in the heart of Riga at 1a E. Melngaiļa street. It is the second biggest football stadium with 8,087 seats, VIP lounges, offices, a press centre and cafes.

Use 

Skonto Stadium is mostly used for hosting football matches. Since its opening in 2000, it has been the home stadium for the Latvian Higher League club Skonto Riga and Latvia national football team, as well as Latvia U-21.

International artists have performed at this venue, including Aerosmith and Metallica in 2008, both of whom reached the maximum capacity for concerts, with 32,000 and 33,000 fans, respectively. Several other artists have performed there too, for example, Snoop Dogg, Massive Attack, Depeche Mode and Akon.

In 2003 Skonto stadium hosted the Latvian Song and Dance Festival, but in 2008 a friendly match between Latvian and Georgian football veterans was played at this venue.

In 2009 Latvian football club FK Ventspils used this stadium for its home matches in the UEFA Europa League matches, because of technical problems with its own stadium.

Attendance 

The largest attendance seen by the Skonto Stadium in a football match was 9,000 people in 2003 for the UEFA Euro 2004 qualifying playoff game between Latvia and Turkey.

References

Sports venues completed in 2000
Buildings and structures in Riga
Football venues in Latvia
Latvia
2000 establishments in Latvia